This is a list of shale oil operations in Australia. Operations include mining of oil shale, extraction of crude shale oil, and refining of oil products. As there are no shale oil operations currently, this list of historical interest only.  The list is grouped first by state and then by location, in alphabetical order. If there was more than one operation at a location, the operations there are listed in approximate chronological order.

New South Wales 
Oil shale outcrops at places over a wide area of New South Wales, to the east of the watershed of the Great Dividing Range.

Shale oil operations in New South Wales can be divided into these periods:

 1865 to 1872 - commencement of a local industry supplying kerosene, candles, and lubricants, for the local market, or oil shale (or oil) for use in town gas enrichment, locally and for export.
 1873 to 1906 - the industry was dominated by two companies, Australian Kerosene Oil & Mineral and N.S.W. Shale & Oil, both amalgamations of smaller ones; some smaller ventures continued operating.
 1906 to 1922 - large greenfield developments using English capital, at Newnes and Murrurundi, ending in failure, due largely to cheaper imported 'conventional' crude oil and petroleum products.
 1922 to 1938 - various attempts to re-establish the industry, culminating in the plans, in 1937, for a modern plant at Glen Davis; some small ventures operated sporadically during this period.
 1939 to 1945 - a number of small operations started production, mainly to overcome wartime fuel shortages, and the commencement of production at the large plant at Glen Davis.
 1945 to 1952 - the final years of the industry, which saw the closure of Glen Davis and the abandonment of plans for a large operation at Baerami Creek.

The list below shows shale oil operations that have been recorded in New South Wales; it may not be a complete list.

Queensland 
Queensland has the largest deposits of oil shale in Australia. Aside from limited activities around the time of the Second World War, there was little done to exploit those resources, until after the  1973 oil crisis. Activity decreased after the fall in oil prices, . After that time, the adverse environmental consequences of mining and processing the shale became increasingly significant to public acceptance and  government approval.

The list below shows shale oil operations that have been recorded in Queensland; it may not be a complete list.

Tasmania 
Deposits of Tasmanite oil shale were identified in the valley of the Mersey River, in Northern Tasmania, in the 1860s. Despite much effort and time, and experiments with different retorting processes, the industry in Tasmania proved not to be economically-viable, under the prevailing circumstances and without the government support that did not eventuate. 

The list below shows shale oil operations that have been recorded in Tasmania; it may not be a complete list.

Victoria 
Operations in Victoria were confined to refining of crude oil from shale. The is no record of oil shale being mined in Victoria.

The list below shows shale oil operations that have been recorded in Victoria; it may not be a complete list.

Other states and territories 
There are no recorded commercial shale oil operations that were outside New South Wales, Queensland, Tasmania, and Victoria. However, there are deposits of oil shale, in other states and territories of Australia. In the past, there has been some exploration work on deposits in South Australia, Western Australia, and in the Northern Territory.

See also 

 Oil shale in Australia

References 

Shale oil companies of Australia